Jimmy Jackson (July 25, 1910 – November 24, 1984) was an American racecar driver from Indianapolis, Indiana.

Indianapolis 500 results

* shared drive with Duane Carter

World Championship career summary
Jackson participated in two World Championship races (the 1950 and 1954 editions of the Indianapolis 500), but scored no World Championship points. The Indianapolis 500 was part of the FIA World Championship from 1950 through 1960. Drivers competing at Indy during those years were credited with World Championship points and participation.

References

1910 births
1984 deaths
Indianapolis 500 drivers
Racing drivers from Indianapolis